Annapolis Neck, a suburb of Annapolis, is a census-designated place in Anne Arundel County, Maryland, United States. As of the 2010 census, its population was 10,950.

Demographics

References

Census-designated places in Maryland
Census-designated places in Anne Arundel County, Maryland
Suburbs of Annapolis, Maryland